Asa Bopp Farr Butterfield (born Asa Maxwell Thornton Farr Butterfield on 1 April 1997) is an English actor. He has received nominations for three British Independent Film Awards, two Critics' Choice Awards, two Saturn Awards, and three Young Artist Awards.

Beginning his career as a child actor, Butterfield first achieved recognition as the lead of the historical drama film The Boy in the Striped Pyjamas (2008). He continued to headline films during the 2010s, starring in the adventure drama Hugo (2011), the war science fiction film Ender's Game (2013), the drama X+Y (2014), and the fantasy Miss Peregrine's Home for Peculiar Children (2016). In 2019, Butterfield began portraying the lead of the Netflix comedy-drama series Sex Education.

Early life
Asa Maxwell Thornton Farr Butterfield was born on 1 April 1997, in Islington, London, England, and is the son of Jacqueline Farr, a psychologist, and Sam Butterfield, an advertising copywriter. He was educated at Stoke Newington School.

Career
Butterfield started acting at age seven at the Young Actors Theatre Islington. Later, he secured minor roles in the 2006 television drama After Thomas and the 2007 film Son of Rambow.

In 2008, he had a guest role playing Donny in the television series Ashes to Ashes. In that same year, aged ten, Butterfield played the lead role in The Boy in the Striped Pyjamas. Director Mark Herman said that they came across Butterfield early on in the audition process. He was on the first audition tape he received and he was the third hopeful he met in person. Herman thought Butterfield's performance was outstanding, but only decided to cast him after auditioning hundreds of other boys, "so no stone was left unturned". Herman and producer David Heyman were looking for someone who was able to portray the main character's innocence, so they asked each of the children what they knew about the Holocaust. Butterfield's knowledge was slim and it was purposely kept that way throughout filming so it would be easier for him to convey his character's innocence. The final scenes of the film were shot at the end of the production period to prepare both him and Jack Scanlon for the dramatic ending of the film.

Butterfield beat hundreds of boys to the role and also successfully passed the auditions for a role in Mr. Nobody for which he auditioned at the same time. He elected not to pursue the latter role. In 2008, he portrayed Mordred in the Merlin episode "The Beginning of the End"; Butterfield appeared as Mordred in a number of subsequent episodes. In 2010, he had a small part in The Wolfman. He starred as Norman Green in Nanny McPhee and the Big Bang (2010). The film, and his performance, both received positive reviews.

At age 13, Butterfield played the main and title character in Martin Scorsese's Hugo, adapted from the novel The Invention of Hugo Cabret. Hugo was released on 23 November 2011, and achieved critical success. Butterfield played the title role of Andrew "Ender" Wiggin in the film adaptation of the Orson Scott Card novel Ender's Game. The film was released in 2013.

After the shooting of Ender's Game, Butterfield was cast in coming of age British drama X+Y as Nathan Ellis, a mathematical savant on the autism spectrum selected to compete in an internationally renowned mathematics competition. The film premiered on 5 September 2014 at the Toronto International Film Festival. Butterfield's performance received widespread critical acclaim and saw him nominated for the BIFA Award for Best Actor.
In 2015, Butterfield appeared in a film adaptation of Ten Thousand Saints. In 2016, he portrayed Jacob Portman in Miss Peregrine's Home for Peculiar Children. He also starred as Gardner Elliot in the film The Space Between Us and as Sebastian in The House of Tomorrow in 2017. In 2018, Butterfield was cast in the main role of Otis Milburn on the Netflix comedy-drama series Sex Education. The series was released on 11 January 2019 to critical acclaim. The second season was released on 17 January 2020 and the third on 17 September 2021.

Other ventures 
Butterfield enjoys making and producing music, and released a mashup of the songs "Teenage Dirtbag" by Wheatus and "Making Plans for Nigel" by XTC. Along with his brother, he is part of a music group called Mambo Fresh. In late 2012, Butterfield co-designed a turn-based video game for iPad with his father and brother called Racing Blind. The game was released to the App Store on 7 April 2013.

Butterfield is involved in competitive Nintendo gaming. In 2017, he competed in the Nintendo World Championships, where he was eliminated early in the invitational. He is an enthusiastic player of competitive Super Smash Bros. and has signed with esports team Panda Global under the tag "Stimpy". His first appearance with the organisation was at Genesis 6. In October 2020, he was signed by Team Liquid.

Since 2017, Butterfield has taught an annual acting masterclass at The Reel Scene acting school in London. The three-day "Asa Butterfield Masterclass" course covers improvisation techniques and students work on scenes from Butterfield's films, which are then filmed on the last day. In 2018, students appeared as extras in the film Greed in which Butterfield appeared.

Filmography

Film

Television

Awards and nominations

References

External links

1997 births
Living people
21st-century English male actors
English male child actors
English male film actors
English male television actors
English video game designers
Male actors from London
People from Islington (district)
Super Smash Bros. Ultimate players